Heartsease is a historic home located at Hillsborough, Orange County, North Carolina.  It was built about 1770, and consists of a -story, three-bay, central block dating to the late 18th century, with an early 19th-century -story east wing, and two-story pedimented west wing added in the late 19th century.  It is topped by a gable roof and features a shed porch whose roof supported by plain Tuscan order posts.  It is believed that Heartsease served as the pre-Revolutionary home of Thomas Burke, North Carolina's third governor and a member of the Constitutional Convention.

It was listed on the National Register of Historic Places in 1973.  It is located in the Hillsborough Historic District.

References

External links

Historic American Buildings Survey in North Carolina
Houses on the National Register of Historic Places in North Carolina
Houses completed in 1820
Hillsborough, North Carolina
Houses in Orange County, North Carolina
National Register of Historic Places in Orange County, North Carolina
Individually listed contributing properties to historic districts on the National Register in North Carolina